The 13th European Film Awards were given on 2 December 2000 in Paris, France.

Winners and nominees

Best European Actor
  Sergi López - Harry, He's Here to Help (Harry un ami qui vous veut du bien)
 Jamie Bell - Billy Elliot
 Bruno Ganz - Bread and Tulips (Pane e tulipani)
 Ingvar Eggert Sigurðsson - Angels of the Universe (Englar alheimsins) 
 Krzysztof Siwczyk - Wojaczek
 Stellan Skarsgård - Aberdeen

Best European Actress
  Björk - Dancer in the Dark
 Bibiana Beglau - The Legend of Rita (Die Stille nach dem Schuß)
 Lena Endre -  Faithless (Trolösa)
 Sylvie Testud - The Captive (La captive)
 Julie Walters - Billy Elliot

Best European Cinematographer
  Vittorio Storaro - Goya in Bordeaux (Goya en Burdeos)
Aleksandr Burov - The Wedding (Svadba)
 Agnès Godard - Good Work (Beau travail)
Eric Guichard and Jean-Paul Meurisse - Himalaya (Himalaya - l'enfance d'un chef)
 Yuri Klimenko - The Barracks (Barak)
Edgar Moura - Jaime

Best European Film

Best European Screenwriter
 Agnès Jaoui and Jean-Pierre Bacri - The Taste of Others (Le goût des autres)
Rafael Azcona - Butterfly (La lengua de las mariposas)
Wolfgang Kohlhaase
Maria Svereva and Nana Djordjadze - 27 Missing Kisses (27 )
Doriana Leondeff and Silvio Soldini - Bread and Tulips (Pane e tulipani)
Dominik Moll and Gilles Marchand - Harry, He's Here to Help (Harry un ami qui vous veut du bien)

Best Documentary

References

2000 film awards
European Film Awards ceremonies
Cinema of Paris
2000 in Europe
2000 in French cinema
2000 in Paris
December 2000 events in France